Läkerol is a Swedish brand of candies. The candies are sugar-free pastilles with the major ingredient being gum arabic. The candies are produced in a variety of flavors. The candy is produced by the Swedish confectionery company, Cloetta. Läkerol's primary markets are the Scandinavian areas of northern Europe and Finland, after that Switzerland, The Netherlands, Belgium, Singapore, and Hong Kong.

In 1909, Adolf Ahlgren (1872-1954) introduced Läkerol. To this day,  most Läkerol candies are stamped with the imprint of the letter "A". The name "Läkerol" comes from the Swedish word läka, which means "heal". In the 1980s, Swedish tennis player Björn Borg did a series of advertisements for Läkerol.

References

External links
 Website of Läkerol (Multi-Lingual)
Cloetta website (English)

Brand name confectionery
Swedish brands
Purveyors to the Court of Sweden
1909 establishments in Sweden
Products introduced in 1909
Swedish confectionery
Throat lozenges